St Aldate's may refer to:

St Aldate's, Oxford, a street in Oxford
St Aldate's Church, an Anglican church in Oxford
St Aldate, a former Bishop of Gloucester